The Catawba Valley Athletic Conference (CVAC) was a high school athletic conference in western North Carolina, United States. It was sanctioned by the North Carolina High School Athletic Association (NCHSAA) in the 2A classification. Listed below were conference members:

Bandys
Bunker Hill
Draughn
East Burke
Maiden
Newton-Conover
South Iredell
West Caldwell

High school sports conferences and leagues in the United States
High school sports in North Carolina